Cristoforo Guidalotti Ciocchi del Monte (1484–1564) was an Italian Roman Catholic bishop and cardinal.

Biography

Cristoforo Guidalotti Ciocchi del Monte was born in Arezzo in 1484, the son of Cecco di Cristofano Guidalotti, a patrician of Perugia, and Margherita Ciocchi del Monte.  On his mother's side, he was a first cousin of Pope Julius III.

As a young man, he traveled to Rome and studied under his uncle Cardinal Antonio Maria Ciocchi del Monte, becoming a doctor of both laws. Through a preferment from his uncle, he became archpriest of Sant'Angelo in Vado.

On 21 August 1517 he was elected titular Bishop of Bethlehem, a position previously held by his cousin Gaspare Antonio del Monte. He was transferred to the Diocese of Cagli e Pergola on 10 February 1525, and later to the Diocese of Marseille on 27 June 1550.  On 20 October 1550 he became titular Patriarch of Alexandria, while retaining the Diocese of Marseille.  He resigned the patriarchate sometime before 8 January 1552.

His cousin Pope Julius III made him a cardinal priest in the consistory of 20 November 1551. He received the red hat and the titular church of Santa Prassede on 4 December 1551.

As cardinal, he was a participant in both the papal conclave of April 1555 that elected Pope Marcellus II and the papal conclave of May 1555 that elected Pope Paul IV. He was transferred from the Diocese of Marseille back to the Diocese of Cagli on 9 March 1556. He participated in the papal conclave of 1559 that elected Pope Pius IV.

He died in Sant'Angelo in Vado on 27 October 1564.  He was buried in the main church in Sant'Angelo in Vado.

References

External links and additional sources

1484 births
1564 deaths
16th-century Italian cardinals
Cardinal-nephews
Cristoforo
16th-century Italian Roman Catholic bishops
People from Arezzo